NGC 6281 is an open cluster of stars in the constellation Scorpius. It was not included in the Messier or Caldwell catalogues of nebulous objects, but it is the brightest such cluster in the constellation to be left out of both. It is readily observed with the naked eye; it is located about ° to the east of Mu Scorpii. James Dunlop described the cluster as a "curiously curved line of pretty bright stars, with many stars mixt". John Herschel then described the cluster as both "pretty bright" and "pretty rich".

It is classified as a type II2p cluster and has 55 members with a visual magnitude of 13.5 or greater within 20 arcminutes of the center. The brightest member is 9th magnitude. Overall, the cluster has an integrated visual magnitude of 5.4.

References

External links
 

Scorpius (constellation)
Open clusters
6281